This is a list of awards and honors given to actor James Stewart (1908–1997).

U.S. Military and civilian awards

James Stewart was drafted in October 1940 into the United States Army, although he was initially rejected for being underweight. Work with a trainer allowed him to pass a subsequent physical, and he enlisted in the USAAC in March 1941. During World War II he was awarded two Distinguished Flying Crosses and four Air Medals, as well as the French Croix de Guerre with bronze palm.

Recording industry awards
Though he was most well-known for his film roles, in 1991 Stewart was nominated for a Best Spoken Word Or Non-Musical Recording Grammy for his album Jimmy Stewart And His Poems at the 33rd Annual Grammy Awards.

Film industry awards and honors

Stewart was honored with many awards and nominations for acting during his career in motion pictures, television, and on stage, spanning over 60 years. These include an Academy Award for Best Actor for The Philadelphia Story in 1941.

Major awards

Other awards won

United States National Film Registry
As of 2020, there are 12 films starring James Stewart preserved in the United States National Film Registry by the Library of Congress as being "culturally, historically, or aesthetically significant".

Mr. Smith Goes to Washington (1939)
Destry Rides Again (1939)
The Shop Around the Corner (1940)
The Philadelphia Story (1940)
It's a Wonderful Life (1946)
Winchester '73 (1950)
The Naked Spur (1953)
Rear Window (1954)
Vertigo (1958)
Anatomy of a Murder (1959)
The Man Who Shot Liberty Valance (1962)
How the West Was Won (1962)

AFI 100 Years... series
Stewart was named the third Greatest Male Star of All Time.

AFI's 100 Years... 100 Movies (10th Anniversary Edition) 
Stewart is the leading actor who is most represented on the list of 100 Films with five of his films. 
Stewart is one of the most represented stars with ten films on the list of 400 nominees.
Vertigo...# 9
It's a Wonderful Life...# 20
Mr. Smith Goes to Washington...# 26
The Philadelphia Story...# 44
Rear Window...# 48
AFI's 100 Years... 100 Cheers
Stewart played the main role in two out of the top five films.
It's a Wonderful Life...# 1
Mr. Smith Goes to Washington...# 5 
The Spirit of St. Louis...# 69 
AFI's 100 Years... 100 Passions
It's a Wonderful Life...# 8
Vertigo...# 18
The Shop Around the Corner...# 28
The Philadelphia Story...# 44
AFI's 100 Years... 100 Thrills
Rear Window...#14
Vertigo...# 18
AFI's 100 Years... 100 Laughs
The Philadelphia Story...# 15
Harvey...# 35
AFI's 100 Years... 100 Heroes and Villains
50 greatest movie heroes 
It's a Wonderful Life...George Bailey ...# 9
Mr. Smith Goes to Washington...Jefferson Smith ...# 11
AFI's 10 Top 10
Stewart is the most represented leading actor with six films, making his mark in four genres.
Mystery film
Vertigo...# 1 
Rear Window...# 3
Fantasy
It's a Wonderful Life...# 3
Harvey...# 7 
Romantic Comedies
The Philadelphia Story...# 5
Courtroom Drama
Anatomy of a Murder...# 7

IMDb Top 250 movies
Films continuously listed on the IMDb Top 250 movies:
Rear Window (1954)
It's a Wonderful Life (1946)
Vertigo (1958)
Mr. Smith Goes to Washington (1939)
Harvey（1950）
Anatomy of a Murder （1959）
Rope （1948）

Entertainment Weekly
Stewart is the most represented leading actor with five films on the 100 Greatest Movies of All Time list presented by Entertainment Weekly. 
Vertigo (1958)
Mr. Smith Goes to Washington (1939)
The Philadelphia Story (1940)
It's a Wonderful Life (1946)
The Shop Around the Corner (1940)

Honors and titles
In 1947, Princeton University presented Stewart with an honorary degree. In 1990, the university awarded him its highest alumni honor, the "Woodrow Wilson Award" for outstanding public service. On 30 May 1997, Princeton further honored Stewart by a special tribute and the dedication of the "James M. Stewart '32 Theater."
Stewart was presented the "Silver Buffalo Award", the national-level distinguished service award of the Boy Scouts of America in 1958.
In 1958, Stewart was named Reserve Wing Commander HQ 11th Wing, Bolling AFB, USAF Historian, Maxwell AFB.
In 1967, "The Pennsylvania Award for Excellence in the Performing Arts" was awarded to Stewart.
In 1971, Stewart was named "Man of the Year" by Harvard University's performance group, the Hasty Pudding Theatricals.
In 1978, Stewart was awarded The George Eastman Award, given by George Eastman House for distinguished contribution to the art of film.
In 1983, he was presented the "Golden Boot Award" recognizing individuals who have made significant contributions to the genre of Western television and movies.

Memorials and tributes

Stewart has a star on the Hollywood Walk of Fame at 1708 Vine Street. The star was once stolen but was subsequently replaced.
Stewart was invited to leave his handprints in the forecourt of Grauman's Chinese Theatre in 1948.
In 1945, Col. James Stewart was featured on the cover of Life.
In 1971, James Stewart was featured on the cover of TV Guide.
In honor of his years of service with the U.S. Air Force, Brig. Gen. Stewart's original World War II A-2 jacket (a Rough Wear 1401 contract) has been displayed for many years at the National Museum of the United States Air Force in Dayton, Ohio. A patch for the 703rd Bomb Squadron is still sewn on the front of the jacket.
A World War II air force uniform belonging to Stewart is also on display in the American Air Museum at the Imperial War Museum at Duxford, near Cambridge, England.
In 1972, Stewart was inducted into the Western Performers Hall of Fame at the National Cowboy & Western Heritage Museum in Oklahoma City, Oklahoma.
In his hometown, Indiana, Pennsylvania, a larger-than-life statue of Stewart was erected on the lawn of the Indiana County Courthouse on 20 May 1983 to celebrate Stewart's 75th birthday. In 1995, The Jimmy Stewart Museum, a museum dedicated to his life and career, opened as well in Indiana, Pennsylvania. A replica of his statue, rendered in green fiberglass resides in the museum. The Jimmy Stewart Museum also presents the "Harvey Award" to a distinguished celebrity tied to James Stewart's spirit of humanitarianism, citizenship, service to country and love of family. Recipients include Robert Wagner, Shirley Jones, Janet Leigh, Rich Little, Grace Kelly, Jim Caviezel.
James Stewart also has the Indiana County-Jimmy Stewart Airport named in his honor in Pennsylvania.
In November 1997, Los Angeles County Supervisor Mike Antonovich led an unsuccessful attempt to have Los Angeles International Airport renamed in Stewart's honour.
In 1998, a year after Stewart's death, a monument was erected in his memory in Griffith Park, Los Angeles, where he hosted his annual "The Jimmy Stewart Relay Marathon Race". The monument consists of a 25-foot flagpole, atop a rock pedestal, with a plaque praising the actor.
An award for Boy Scouts, "The James M. Stewart Good Citizenship Award" has been presented since 17 May 2003.
On 13 August 2007, Building 52 on Bolling AFB, Washington D.C. was dedicated to Stewart and was renamed "Brigadier General Jimmy Stewart Theater". In the 1940s, the facility served as the base theater. In honor of General Stewart's distinguished military and film careers, the first video shown in the newly dedicated theater was a ten-minute Air Force recruitment spot he did as a lieutenant. General Stewart was the acting Reserve Wing Commander 11th Wing, at Bolling AFB in 1957–1958.
On 17 August 2007, the United States Postal Service issued a 41-cent commemorative postage stamp honoring James Stewart, with the ceremonies being held at Universal Studios in Hollywood, California.
On the centenary of James Stewart's birth, 20 May 2008, Turner Classic Movies honored him with a marathon of his films, including The Stratton Story, The Mortal Storm, The Shop Around the Corner, The Philadelphia Story, The Glenn Miller Story, The Man Who Knew Too Much, Vertigo, Rear Window, The Man Who Shot Liberty Valance, Anatomy of a Murder, Mr. Smith Goes to Washington, and Harvey.
On 24 May 2008, the "Centennial Festival Day" was held in Stewart's hometown, centering on the Indiana County courthouse and Jimmy Stewart Museum. Items from Stewart's home were on display at the Indiana County Historical Society. An exhibit called "Dear Mr. Stewart," a collection of gifts to Stewart from fans, was on display. The items range from a poem ripped out of a notebook to an ostrich egg. The Boy Scouts had themed activity stations for children based on Stewart films. Co-star Grace Kelly was presented posthumously the "Harvey Award". The celebration also included a fly-over by the USAF, the USAF Brass Band and others, screenings of Stewart's films, and completing with birthday cake.
On June 12, 2008, the Academy of Motion Picture Arts and Sciences hosted “A Centennial Tribute to James Stewart” in Beverly Hills, California. The program included film clips and comments from family, friends and colleagues. It also served as the closing for the University of California, Los Angeles Film & Television Archive's film festival "The Picture Starts in Heaven: James Stewart's Centennial", which began on 23 May 2008 in Westwood, Los Angeles, California.
General Stewart was also bestowed the honor of having a Civil Air Patrol Composite Squadron named after him, with his permission. The Squadron is located in Sayreville, New Jersey, and is part of Group 223.
An award for excellent student filmmakers, "The Jimmy Stewart Memorial Crystal Heart Award" has been presented since 1999.

See also
James Stewart filmography

References

Stewart, James